The TVyNovelas Award for Best Program of Pay Television category is in the annual Premios TVyNovelas awards program for Mexican telenovelas (soap operas).

This category was previously known as Best Restricted TV Program, from 2007 to 2017.

Winners and nominees

2000s

2010s

Records  
 Most awarded program: Está cañón and Miembros al Aire, 3 times.
 Most nominated program: Netas Divinas with 11 nominations.
 Most nominated program without a win: Pa' la banda Night Show and STANDparados with 2 nominations.
 Program winning after short time: Está cañón, 2 consecutive years.
 Program winning after long time: Netas divinas (2009 and 2020), 11 years' difference.

References

External links 
TVyNovelas at esmas.com
TVyNovelas Awards at the univision.com

 Restricted TV Program
Restricted TV Program
Restricted TV Program